DYEZ may refer to:
 DYEZ-AM, an AM radio station broadcasting in Bacolod, branded as Aksyon Radyo
 DYEZ-FM, an FM radio station broadcasting in Puerto Princesa, branded as Love Radio